American Recordings may refer to:

American Recordings (record label), a US record label
American Recordings (album), a 1994 album by Johnny Cash